Saad Mohammed Raheem (1957–2018) was an Iraqi writer.

He was born in Diyala Governorate in eastern Iraq in 1957. He studied economics at Mustansiriya University, graduating with a bachelor's degree in 1980. He wrote several collections of short stories, among them Almond Blossom (2009) which won the 2010 Creativity Prize for the Short Story. He also published three novels: Twilight of the Wader (2000), which won the 2000 Creativity Award for Fiction, The Song of a Woman, Twilight of the Sea (2012), and The Bookseller's Murder (2016), which was nominated for the Arabic Booker Prize. A well-known journalist in his native Iraq, he won the 2005 Iraqi Award for Best Investigative Journalism.

He died of a stroke in Sulaymaniyah in April 2018.

References

1957 births
2018 deaths
Iraqi male writers
20th-century Iraqi writers
21st-century Iraqi writers
People from Diyala Province